The American Civil War (April 12, 1861 – May 26, 1865; also known by other names) was a civil war in the United States. It was fought between the Union ("the North") and the Confederacy ("the South"), the latter formed by states that had seceded. The central cause of the war was the dispute over whether slavery would be permitted to expand into the western territories, leading to more slave states, or be prevented from doing so, which was widely believed would place slavery on a course of ultimate extinction.

Decades of political controversy over slavery were brought to a head by the victory in the 1860 U.S. presidential election of Abraham Lincoln, who opposed slavery's expansion into the western territories. An initial seven southern slave states responded to Lincoln's victory by seceding from the United States and, in February 1861, forming the Confederacy. The Confederacy seized U.S. forts and other federal assets within their borders. Led by Confederate President Jefferson Davis, the Confederacy asserted control over about a third of the U.S. population in eleven of the 34 U.S. states that then existed. Four years of intense combat, mostly in the South, ensued.

During 1861–1862 in the war's Western Theater, the Union made significant permanent gainsthough in the war's Eastern Theater the conflict was inconclusive. The abolition of slavery became a war goal on January 1, 1863, when Lincoln issued the Emancipation Proclamation, which declared all slaves in states in rebellion to be free, applying to more than 3.5 million of the 4 million enslaved people in the country. Former slaves who escaped from plantations or were liberated by the Union Army were recruited into the United States Colored Troops regiments of the Union Army. To the west, the Union destroyed the Confederate's river navy by the summer of 1862, then much of its western armies, and seized New Orleans. The successful 1863 Union siege of Vicksburg split the Confederacy in two at the Mississippi River. In 1863, Confederate General Robert E. Lee's incursion north ended at the Battle of Gettysburg. Western successes led to General Ulysses S. Grant's command of all Union armies in 1864. Inflicting an ever-tightening naval blockade of Confederate ports, the Union marshaled resources and manpower to attack the Confederacy from all directions. This led to the fall of Atlanta in 1864 to Union General William Tecumseh Sherman, followed by his march to the sea. The last significant battles raged around the ten-month Siege of Petersburg, gateway to the Confederate capital of Richmond. The Confederates abandoned Richmond, and on April 9, 1865, Lee surrendered to Grant following the Battle of Appomattox Court House, setting in motion the end of the war.

A wave of Confederate surrenders followed. On April 14, just five days after Lee's surrender, Lincoln was assassinated. As a practical matter, the war ended with the May 26 surrender of the Department of the Trans-Mississippi but the conclusion of the American Civil War lacks a clear and precise historical end date. Confederate ground forces continued surrendering past the May 26 surrender date until June 23. By the end of the war, much of the South's infrastructure was destroyed, especially its railroads. The Confederacy collapsed, slavery was abolished, and four million enslaved black people were freed. The war-torn nation then entered the Reconstruction era in an attempt to rebuild the country, bring the former Confederate states back into the United States, and grant civil rights to freed slaves.

The Civil War is one of the most extensively studied and written about episodes in U.S. history. It remains the subject of cultural and historiographical debate. Of particular interest is the persisting myth of the Lost Cause of the Confederacy. The American Civil War was among the first wars to use industrial warfare. Railroads, the telegraph, steamships, the ironclad warship, and mass-produced weapons were all widely used during the war. In total, the war left between 620,000 and 750,000 soldiers dead, along with an undetermined number of civilian casualties, making the Civil War the deadliest military conflict in American history. The technology and brutality of the Civil War foreshadowed the coming World Wars.

Causes of secession

The causes behind Southern states' decision to secede were complex and have been historically controversial; most academic scholars identify slavery as the central cause of the war. The causes are further complicated by some historical revisionists who have tried to offer a variety of reasons for the war. Slavery was the central source of escalating political tension in the 1850s. The Republican Party was determined to prevent any spread of slavery to the territories, which, after they were admitted as states, would give the North greater representation in Congress and the Electoral College. Many Southern leaders had threatened secession if the Republican candidate, Lincoln, won the 1860 election. After Lincoln won, many Southern leaders felt that disunion was their only option, fearing that the loss of representation would hamper their ability to enact pro-slavery laws and policies. In his second inaugural address, Lincoln said that "slaves constituted a peculiar and powerful interest. All knew that this interest was, somehow, the cause of the war. To strengthen, perpetuate, and extend this interest was the object for which the insurgents would rend the Union, even by war; while the government claimed no right to do more than to restrict the territorial enlargement of it."

Slavery

Disagreements among states about the future of slavery were the main cause of disunion and the war that followed. Slavery had been controversial during the framing of the Constitution, which, because of compromises, ended up with proslavery and antislavery features. The issue of slavery had confounded the nation since its inception and increasingly separated the United States into a slaveholding South and a free North. The issue was exacerbated by the rapid territorial expansion of the country, which repeatedly brought to the fore the question of whether new territory should be slaveholding or free. The issue had dominated politics for decades leading up to the war. Key attempts to resolve the matter included the Missouri Compromise and the Compromise of 1850, but these only postponed the showdown over slavery that would lead to the Civil War.

The motivations of the average person were not necessarily those of their faction; some Northern soldiers were indifferent on the subject of slavery, but a general pattern can be established. As the war dragged on, more and more Unionists came to support the abolition of slavery, whether on moral grounds or as a means to cripple the Confederacy. Confederate soldiers fought the war primarily to protect a Southern society of which slavery was an integral part. Opponents of slavery considered slavery an anachronistic evil incompatible with republicanism. The strategy of the anti-slavery forces was containment—to stop the expansion of slavery and thereby put it on a path to ultimate extinction. The slaveholding interests in the South denounced this strategy as infringing upon their constitutional rights. Southern whites believed that the emancipation of slaves would destroy the South's economy, because of the large amount of capital invested in slaves and fears of integrating the ex-slave black population. In particular, many Southerners feared a repeat of the 1804 Haiti massacre (referred to at the time as "the horrors of Santo Domingo"), in which former slaves systematically murdered most of what was left of the country's white population—including men, women, children, and even many sympathetic to abolition—after the successful slave revolt in Haiti. Historian Thomas Fleming points to the historical phrase "a disease in the public mind" used by critics of this idea and proposes it contributed to the segregation in the Jim Crow era following emancipation. These fears were exacerbated by the 1859 attempt of John Brown to instigate an armed slave rebellion in the South.

Abolitionists

The abolitionists—those advocating the end of slavery—were active in the decades leading up to the Civil War. They traced their philosophical roots back to Puritans, who believed that slavery was morally wrong. One of the early Puritan writings on this subject was The Selling of Joseph, by Samuel Sewall in 1700. In it, Sewall condemned slavery and the slave trade and refuted many of the era's typical justifications for slavery.

The American Revolution and the cause of liberty added tremendous impetus to the abolitionist cause. Slavery, which had been around for thousands of years, was considered normal and was not a significant issue of public debate prior to the Revolution. The Revolution changed that and made it into an issue that had to be addressed. As a result, during and shortly after the Revolution, the Northern states quickly started outlawing slavery. Even in Southern states, laws were changed to limit slavery and facilitate manumission. The amount of indentured servitude dropped dramatically throughout the country. An Act Prohibiting Importation of Slaves sailed through Congress with little opposition. President Thomas Jefferson supported it, and it went into effect on January 1, 1808, which was the first day that the Constitution (Article I, section 9, clause 1) permitted Congress to prohibit the importation of slaves. Benjamin Franklin and James Madison each helped found manumission societies. Influenced by the Revolution, many slave owners freed their slaves, but some, such as George Washington, did so only in their wills. The number of free black people as a proportion of the black population in the upper South increased from less than 1 percent to nearly 10 percent between 1790 and 1810 as a result of these actions.

The establishment of the Northwest Territory as "free soil"—no slavery—by Manasseh Cutler and Rufus Putnam (who both came from Puritan New England) would also prove crucial. This territory (which became the states of Ohio, Michigan, Indiana, Illinois, Wisconsin and part of Minnesota) doubled the size of the United States.

In the decades leading up to the Civil War, abolitionists, such as Theodore Parker, Ralph Waldo Emerson, Henry David Thoreau and Frederick Douglass, repeatedly used the Puritan heritage of the country to bolster their cause. The most radical anti-slavery newspaper, The Liberator, invoked the Puritans and Puritan values over a thousand times. Parker, in urging New England congressmen to support the abolition of slavery, wrote, "The son of the Puritan . . . is sent to Congress to stand up for Truth and Right." Literature served as a means to spread the message to common folks. Key works included Twelve Years a Slave, the Narrative of the Life of Frederick Douglass, American Slavery as It Is, and the most important: Uncle Tom's Cabin, the best-selling book of the 19th century aside from the Bible.

A more unusual abolitionist than those named above was Hinton Rowan Helper, whose 1857 book, The Impending Crisis of the South: How to Meet It, "[e]ven more perhaps than Uncle Tom's Cabin ... fed the fires of sectional controversy leading up to the Civil War." A Southerner and a virulent racist, Helper was nevertheless an abolitionist because he believed, and showed with statistics, that slavery "impeded the progress and prosperity of the South, ... dwindled our commerce, and other similar pursuits, into the most contemptible insignificance; sunk a large majority of our people in galling poverty and ignorance, ... [and] entailed upon us a humiliating dependence on the Free States...."

By 1840 more than 15,000 people were members of abolitionist societies in the United States. Abolitionism in the United States became a popular expression of moralism, and led directly to the Civil War. In churches, conventions and newspapers, reformers promoted an absolute and immediate rejection of slavery. Support for abolition among the religious was not universal though. As the war approached, even the main denominations split along political lines, forming rival Southern and Northern churches. For example, in 1845 the Baptists split into the Northern Baptists and Southern Baptists over the issue of slavery.

Abolitionist sentiment was not strictly religious or moral in origin. The Whig Party became increasingly opposed to slavery because it saw it as inherently against the ideals of capitalism and the free market. Whig leader William H. Seward (who would serve as Lincoln's secretary of state) proclaimed that there was an "irrepressible conflict" between slavery and free labor, and that slavery had left the South backward and undeveloped. As the Whig party dissolved in the 1850s, the mantle of abolition fell to its newly formed successor, the Republican Party.

Territorial crisis

Manifest destiny heightened the conflict over slavery. Each new territory acquired had to face the thorny question of whether to allow or disallow the "peculiar institution". Between 1803 and 1854, the United States achieved a vast expansion of territory through purchase, negotiation, and conquest. At first, the new states carved out of these territories entering the union were apportioned equally between slave and free states. Pro- and anti-slavery forces collided over the territories west of the Mississippi.

The Mexican–American War and its aftermath was a key territorial event in the leadup to the war. As the Treaty of Guadalupe Hidalgo finalized the conquest of northern Mexico west to California in 1848, slaveholding interests looked forward to expanding into these lands and perhaps Cuba and Central America as well. Prophetically, Ralph Waldo Emerson wrote that "Mexico will poison us", referring to the ensuing divisions around whether the newly conquered lands would end up slave or free. Northern free-soil interests vigorously sought to curtail any further expansion of slave territory. The Compromise of 1850 over California balanced a free-soil state with a stronger federal fugitive slave law for a political settlement after four years of strife in the 1840s. But the states admitted following California were all free: Minnesota (1858), Oregon (1859), and Kansas (1861). In the Southern states, the question of the territorial expansion of slavery westward again became explosive. Both the South and the North drew the same conclusion: "The power to decide the question of slavery for the territories was the power to determine the future of slavery itself."

By 1860, four doctrines had emerged to answer the question of federal control in the territories, and they all claimed they were sanctioned by the Constitution, implicitly or explicitly. The first of these theories, represented by the Constitutional Union Party, argued that the Missouri Compromise apportionment of territory north for free soil and south for slavery should become a constitutional mandate. The failed Crittenden Compromise of 1860 was an expression of this view.

The second doctrine of congressional preeminence was championed by Abraham Lincoln and the Republican Party. It insisted that the Constitution did not bind legislators to a policy of balance—that slavery could be excluded in a territory, as it was in the Northwest Ordinance of 1787, at the discretion of Congress. Thus Congress could restrict human bondage, but never establish it. The ill-fated Wilmot Proviso announced this position in 1846. The Proviso was a pivotal moment in national politics, as it was the first time slavery had become a major congressional issue based on sectionalism, instead of party lines. Its support by Northern Democrats and Whigs, and opposition by Southerners, was a dark omen of coming divisions.

Senator Stephen A. Douglas proclaimed the third doctrine: territorial or "popular" sovereignty, which asserted that the settlers in a territory had the same rights as states in the Union to allow or disallow slavery as a purely local matter. The Kansas–Nebraska Act of 1854 legislated this doctrine. In the Kansas Territory, political conflict spawned "Bleeding Kansas", a five-year paramilitary conflict between pro- and anti-slavery supporters. The U.S. House of Representatives voted to admit Kansas as a free state in early 1860, but its admission did not pass the Senate until January 1861, after the departure of Southern senators.

The fourth doctrine was advocated by Mississippi Senator (and soon to be Confederate President) Jefferson Davis. It was one of state sovereignty ("states' rights"), also known as the "Calhoun doctrine", named after the South Carolinian political theorist and statesman John C. Calhoun. Rejecting the arguments for federal authority or self-government, state sovereignty would empower states to promote the expansion of slavery as part of the federal union under the U.S. Constitution. These four doctrines comprised the dominant ideologies presented to the American public on the matters of slavery, the territories, and the U.S. Constitution before the 1860 presidential election.

States' rights
A long-running dispute over the origin of the Civil War is to what extent states' rights triggered the conflict. The consensus among historians is that the Civil War was  fought about states' rights. But the issue is frequently referenced in popular accounts of the war and has much traction among Southerners. Southerners advocating secession argued that just as each state had decided to join the Union, a state had the right to secede—leave the Union—at any time. Northerners (including pro-slavery President Buchanan) rejected that notion as opposed to the will of the Founding Fathers, who said they were setting up a perpetual union.

Historian James McPherson points out that even if Confederates genuinely fought over states' rights, it boiled down to states' right to slavery. McPherson writes concerning states' rights and other non-slavery explanations:

States' rights was an ideology formulated and applied as a means of advancing slave state interests through federal authority. As historian Thomas L. Krannawitter points out, the "Southern demand for federal slave protection represented a demand for an unprecedented expansion of Federal power." Before the Civil War, the Southern states supported the use of federal powers to enforce and extend slavery, as with the Fugitive Slave Act of 1850 and the Dred Scott v. Sandford decision. The faction that pushed for secession often infringed on states' rights. Because of the overrepresentation of pro-slavery factions in the federal government, many Northerners, even non-abolitionists, feared the Slave Power conspiracy. Some Northern states resisted the enforcement of the Fugitive Slave Act. Historian Eric Foner states that the act "could hardly have been designed to arouse greater opposition in the North. It overrode numerous state and local laws and legal procedures and 'commanded' individual citizens to assist, when called upon, in capturing runaways." He continues, "It certainly did not reveal, on the part of slaveholders, sensitivity to states' rights." According to historian Paul Finkelman, "the southern states mostly complained that the northern states were asserting their states' rights and that the national government was not powerful enough to counter these northern claims." The Confederate Constitution also "federally" required slavery to be legal in all Confederate states and claimed territories.

Sectionalism
Sectionalism resulted from the different economies, social structure, customs, and political values of the North and South. Regional tensions came to a head during the War of 1812, resulting in the Hartford Convention, which manifested Northern dissatisfaction with a foreign trade embargo that affected the industrial North disproportionately, the Three-Fifths Compromise, dilution of Northern power by new states, and a succession of Southern presidents. Sectionalism increased steadily between 1800 and 1860 as the North, which phased slavery out of existence, industrialized, urbanized, and built prosperous farms, while the deep South concentrated on plantation agriculture based on slave labor, together with subsistence agriculture for poor whites. In the 1840s and 1850s, the issue of accepting slavery (in the guise of rejecting slave-owning bishops and missionaries) split the nation's largest religious denominations (the Methodist, Baptist, and Presbyterian churches) into separate Northern and Southern denominations.

Historians have debated whether economic differences between the mainly industrial North and the mainly agricultural South helped cause the war. Most historians now disagree with the economic determinism of historian Charles A. Beard in the 1920s, and emphasize that Northern and Southern economies were largely complementary. While socially different, the sections economically benefited each other.

Protectionism
Owners of slaves preferred low-cost manual labor with no mechanization. Northern manufacturing interests supported tariffs and protectionism while Southern planters demanded free trade. The Democrats in Congress, controlled by Southerners, wrote the tariff laws in the 1830s, 1840s, and 1850s, and kept reducing rates so that the 1857 rates were the lowest since 1816. The Republicans called for an increase in tariffs in the 1860 election. The increases were only enacted in 1861 after Southerners resigned their seats in Congress. The tariff issue was a Northern grievance. However, neo-Confederate writers have claimed it as a Southern grievance. In 1860–61 none of the groups that proposed compromises to head off secession raised the tariff issue. Pamphleteers from the North and the South rarely mentioned the tariff.

Nationalism and honor

Nationalism was a powerful force in the early 19th century, with famous spokesmen such as Andrew Jackson and Daniel Webster. While practically all Northerners supported the Union, Southerners were split between those loyal to the entirety of the United States (called "Southern Unionists") and those loyal primarily to the Southern region and then the Confederacy.

Perceived insults to Southern collective honor included the enormous popularity of Uncle Tom's Cabin and abolitionist John Brown's attempt to incite a slave rebellion in 1859.

While the South moved towards a Southern nationalism, leaders in the North were also becoming more nationally minded, and they rejected any notion of splitting the Union. The Republican national electoral platform of 1860 warned that Republicans regarded disunion as treason and would not tolerate it. The South ignored the warnings; Southerners did not realize how ardently the North would fight to hold the Union together.

Lincoln's election

The election of Abraham Lincoln in November 1860 was the final trigger for secession. Southern leaders feared that Lincoln would stop the expansion of slavery and put it on a course toward extinction. However, Lincoln would not be inaugurated until five months after the election, which gave the South time to secede and prepare for war in the winter and spring of 1861.

According to Lincoln, the American people had shown that they had been successful in establishing and administering a republic, but a third challenge faced the nation: maintaining a republic based on the people's vote, in the face of an attempt to destroy it.

Outbreak of the war

Secession crisis
The election of Lincoln provoked the legislature of South Carolina to call a state convention to consider secession. Before the war, South Carolina did more than any other Southern state to advance the notion that a state had the right to nullify federal laws, and even to secede from the United States. The convention unanimously voted to secede on December 20, 1860, and adopted a secession declaration. It argued for states' rights for slave owners in the South, but contained a complaint about states' rights in the North in the form of opposition to the Fugitive Slave Act, claiming that Northern states were not fulfilling their federal obligations under the Constitution. The "cotton states" of Mississippi, Florida, Alabama, Georgia, Louisiana, and Texas followed suit, seceding in January and February 1861.

Among the ordinances of secession passed by the individual states, those of three—Texas, Alabama, and Virginia—specifically mentioned the plight of the "slaveholding states" at the hands of Northern abolitionists. The rest make no mention of the slavery issue and are often brief announcements of the dissolution of ties by the legislatures. However, at least four states—South Carolina, Mississippi, Georgia, and Texas—also passed lengthy and detailed explanations of their reasons for secession, all of which laid the blame squarely on the movement to abolish slavery and that movement's influence over the politics of the Northern states. The Southern states believed slaveholding was a constitutional right because of the Fugitive Slave Clause of the Constitution. These states agreed to form a new federal government, the Confederate States of America, on February 4, 1861. They took control of federal forts and other properties within their boundaries with little resistance from outgoing President James Buchanan, whose term ended on March 4, 1861. Buchanan said that the Dred Scott decision was proof that the South had no reason for secession, and that the Union "was intended to be perpetual", but that "The power by force of arms to compel a State to remain in the Union" was not among the "enumerated powers granted to Congress". One-quarter of the U.S. Army—the entire garrison in Texas—was surrendered in February 1861 to state forces by its commanding general, David E. Twiggs, who then joined the Confederacy.

As Southerners resigned their seats in the Senate and the House, Republicans were able to pass projects that had been blocked by Southern senators before the war. These included the Morrill Tariff, land grant colleges (the Morrill Act), a Homestead Act, a transcontinental railroad (the Pacific Railroad Acts), the National Bank Act, the authorization of United States Notes by the Legal Tender Act of 1862, and the ending of slavery in the District of Columbia. The Revenue Act of 1861 introduced the income tax to help finance the war.

In December 1860, the Crittenden Compromise was proposed to re-establish the Missouri Compromise line by constitutionally banning slavery in territories to the north of the line while guaranteeing it to the south. The adoption of this compromise likely would have prevented the secession of the Southern states, but Lincoln and the Republicans rejected it. Lincoln stated that any compromise that would extend slavery would in time bring down the Union. A pre-war February Peace Conference of 1861 met in Washington, proposing a solution similar to that of the Crittenden compromise; it was rejected by Congress. The Republicans proposed an alternative compromise to not interfere with slavery where it existed but the South regarded it as insufficient. Nonetheless, the remaining eight slave states rejected pleas to join the Confederacy following a two-to-one no-vote in Virginia's First Secessionist Convention on April 4, 1861.

On March 4, 1861, Abraham Lincoln was sworn in as president. In his inaugural address, he argued that the Constitution was a more perfect union than the earlier Articles of Confederation and Perpetual Union, that it was a binding contract, and called any secession "legally void". He had no intent to invade Southern states, nor did he intend to end slavery where it existed, but said that he would use force to maintain possession of federal property, including forts, arsenals, mints, and customhouses that had been seized by the Southern states. The government would make no move to recover post offices, and if resisted, mail delivery would end at state lines. Where popular conditions did not allow peaceful enforcement of federal law, U.S. marshals and judges would be withdrawn. No mention was made of bullion lost from U.S. mints in Louisiana, Georgia, and North Carolina. He stated that it would be U.S. policy to only collect import duties at its ports; there could be no serious injury to the South to justify the armed revolution during his administration. His speech closed with a plea for restoration of the bonds of union, famously calling on "the mystic chords of memory" binding the two regions.

The Davis government of the new Confederacy sent three delegates to Washington to negotiate a peace treaty with the United States of America. Lincoln rejected any negotiations with Confederate agents because he claimed the Confederacy was not a legitimate government, and that making any treaty with it would be tantamount to recognition of it as a sovereign government. Lincoln instead attempted to negotiate directly with the governors of individual seceded states, whose administrations he continued to recognize.

Complicating Lincoln's attempts to defuse the crisis were the actions of the new Secretary of State, William Seward. Seward had been Lincoln's main rival for the Republican presidential nomination. Shocked and embittered by this defeat, Seward agreed to support Lincoln's candidacy only after he was guaranteed the executive office that was considered at that time to be the most powerful and important after the presidency itself. Even in the early stages of Lincoln's presidency Seward still held little regard for the new chief executive due to his perceived inexperience, and therefore Seward viewed himself as the de facto head of government or "prime minister" behind the throne of Lincoln. In this role, Seward attempted to engage in unauthorized and indirect negotiations that failed. However, President Lincoln was determined to hold all remaining Union-occupied forts in the Confederacy: Fort Monroe in Virginia, Fort Pickens, Fort Jefferson and Fort Taylor in Florida, and Fort Sumter in South Carolina.

Battle of Fort Sumter

The American Civil War began on April 12, 1861, when Confederate forces opened fire on the Union-held Fort Sumter. Fort Sumter is located in the middle of the harbor of Charleston, South Carolina. Its status had been contentious for months. Outgoing President Buchanan had dithered in reinforcing the Union garrison in the harbor, which was under command of Major Robert Anderson. Anderson took matters into his own hands and on December 26, 1860, under the cover of darkness, sailed the garrison from the poorly placed Fort Moultrie to the stalwart island Fort Sumter. Anderson's actions catapulted him to hero status in the North. An attempt to resupply the fort on January 9, 1861, failed and nearly started the war then and there. But an informal truce held. On March 5, the newly sworn in Lincoln was informed that the Fort was running low on supplies.

Fort Sumter proved to be one of the main challenges of the new Lincoln administration. Back-channel dealing by Secretary of State Seward with the Confederates undermined Lincoln's decision-making; Seward wanted to pull out of the fort. But a firm hand by Lincoln tamed Seward, and Seward became one of Lincoln's staunchest allies. Lincoln ultimately decided that holding the fort, which would require reinforcing it, was the only workable option. Thus, on April 6, Lincoln informed the Governor of South Carolina that a ship with food but no ammunition would attempt to supply the Fort. Historian McPherson describes this win-win approach as "the first sign of the mastery that would mark Lincoln's presidency"; the Union would win if it could resupply and hold onto the Fort, and the South would be the aggressor if it opened fire on an unarmed ship supplying starving men. An April 9 Confederate cabinet meeting resulted in President Davis's ordering General P. G. T. Beauregard to take the Fort before supplies could reach it.

At 4:30 am on April 12, Confederate forces fired the first of 4,000 shells at the Fort; it fell the next day. The loss of Fort Sumter lit a patriotic fire under the North. On April 15, Lincoln called on the states to field 75,000 volunteer troops for 90 days; impassioned Union states met the quotas quickly. On May 3, 1861, Lincoln called for an additional 42,000 volunteers for a period of three years. Shortly after this, Virginia, Tennessee, Arkansas, and North Carolina seceded and joined the Confederacy. To reward Virginia, the Confederate capital was moved to Richmond.

Attitude of the border states

Maryland, Delaware, Missouri, and Kentucky were slave states whose people had divided loyalties to Northern and Southern businesses and family members. Some men enlisted in the Union Army and others in the Confederate Army. West Virginia separated from Virginia and was admitted to the Union on June 20, 1863.

Maryland's territory surrounded the United States' capital of Washington, D.C., and could cut it off from the North. It had numerous anti-Lincoln officials who tolerated anti-army rioting in Baltimore and the burning of bridges, both aimed at hindering the passage of troops to the South. Maryland's legislature voted overwhelmingly (53–13) to stay in the Union, but also rejected hostilities with its southern neighbors, voting to close Maryland's rail lines to prevent them from being used for war. Lincoln responded by establishing martial law and unilaterally suspending habeas corpus in Maryland, along with sending in militia units from the North. Lincoln rapidly took control of Maryland and the District of Columbia by seizing many prominent figures, including arresting 1/3 of the members of the Maryland General Assembly on the day it reconvened. All were held without trial, with Lincoln ignoring a ruling on June 1, 1861, by U.S. Supreme Court Chief Justice Roger Taney, not speaking for the Court, that only Congress (and not the president) could suspend habeas corpus (Ex parte Merryman). Federal troops imprisoned a prominent Baltimore newspaper editor, Frank Key Howard, Francis Scott Key's grandson, after he criticized Lincoln in an editorial for ignoring Taney's ruling.

In Missouri, an elected convention on secession voted decisively to remain within the Union. When pro-Confederate Governor Claiborne F. Jackson called out the state militia, it was attacked by federal forces under General Nathaniel Lyon, who chased the governor and the rest of the State Guard to the southwestern corner of the state (see also: Missouri secession). In the resulting vacuum, the convention on secession reconvened and took power as the Unionist provisional government of Missouri.

Kentucky did not secede; for a time, it declared itself neutral. When Confederate forces entered the state in September 1861, neutrality ended and the state reaffirmed its Union status while maintaining slavery. During a brief invasion by Confederate forces in 1861, Confederate sympathizers organized a secession convention, formed the shadow Confederate Government of Kentucky, inaugurated a governor, and gained recognition from the Confederacy. Its jurisdiction extended only as far as Confederate battle lines in the Commonwealth, and it went into exile after October 1862.

After Virginia's secession, a Unionist government in Wheeling asked 48 counties to vote on an ordinance to create a new state on October 24, 1861. A voter turnout of 34 percent approved the statehood bill (96 percent approving). Twenty-four secessionist counties were included in the new state, and the ensuing guerrilla war engaged about 40,000 federal troops for much of the war. Congress admitted West Virginia to the Union on June 20, 1863. West Virginia provided about 20,000–22,000 soldiers to both the Confederacy and the Union.

A Unionist secession attempt occurred in East Tennessee, but was suppressed by the Confederacy, which arrested over 3,000 men suspected of being loyal to the Union. They were held without trial.

War

The Civil War was a contest marked by the ferocity and frequency of battle. Over four years, 237 named battles were fought, as were many more minor actions and skirmishes, which were often characterized by their bitter intensity and high casualties. In his book The American Civil War, British historian John Keegan writes that "The American Civil War was to prove one of the most ferocious wars ever fought". In many cases, without geographic objectives, the only target for each side was the enemy's soldier.

Mobilization

As the first seven states began organizing a Confederacy in Montgomery, the entire U.S. army numbered 16,000. However, Northern governors had begun to mobilize their militias. The Confederate Congress authorized the new nation up to 100,000 troops sent by governors as early as February. By May, Jefferson Davis was pushing for 100,000 soldiers for one year or the duration, and that was answered in kind by the U.S. Congress.

In the first year of the war, both sides had far more volunteers than they could effectively train and equip. After the initial enthusiasm faded, reliance on the cohort of young men who came of age every year and wanted to join was not enough. Both sides used a draft law—conscription—as a device to encourage or force volunteering; relatively few were drafted and served. The Confederacy passed a draft law in April 1862 for young men aged 18 to 35; overseers of slaves, government officials, and clergymen were exempt. The U.S. Congress followed in July, authorizing a militia draft within a state when it could not meet its quota with volunteers. European immigrants joined the Union Army in large numbers, including 177,000 born in Germany and 144,000 born in Ireland.

When the Emancipation Proclamation went into effect in January 1863, ex-slaves were energetically recruited by the states and used to meet the state quotas. States and local communities offered higher and higher cash bonuses for white volunteers. Congress tightened the law in March 1863. Men selected in the draft could provide substitutes or, until mid-1864, pay commutation money. Many eligibles pooled their money to cover the cost of anyone drafted. Families used the substitute provision to select which man should go into the army and which should stay home. There was much evasion and overt resistance to the draft, especially in Catholic areas. The draft riot in New York City in July 1863 involved Irish immigrants who had been signed up as citizens to swell the vote of the city's Democratic political machine, not realizing it made them liable for the draft. Of the 168,649 men procured for the Union through the draft, 117,986 were substitutes, leaving only 50,663 who had their services conscripted.

In both the North and South, the draft laws were highly unpopular. In the North, some 120,000 men evaded conscription, many of them fleeing to Canada, and another 280,000 soldiers deserted during the war. At least 100,000 Southerners deserted, or about 10 percent; Southern desertion was high because, according to one historian writing in 1991, the highly localized Southern identity meant that many Southern men had little investment in the outcome of the war, with individual soldiers caring more about the fate of their local area than any grand ideal. In the North, "bounty jumpers" enlisted to get the generous bonus, deserted, then went back to a second recruiting station under a different name to sign up again for a second bonus; 141 were caught and executed.

From a tiny frontier force in 1860, the Union and Confederate armies had grown into the "largest and most efficient armies in the world" within a few years. Some European observers at the time dismissed them as amateur and unprofessional, but historian John Keegan concluded that each outmatched the French, Prussian, and Russian armies of the time, and without the Atlantic, would have threatened any of them with defeat.

Prisoners

At the start of the Civil War, a system of paroles operated. Captives agreed not to fight until they were officially exchanged. Meanwhile, they were held in camps run by their army. They were paid, but they were not allowed to perform any military duties. The system of exchanges collapsed in 1863 when the Confederacy refused to exchange black prisoners. After that, about 56,000 of the 409,000 POWs died in prisons during the war, accounting for nearly 10 percent of the conflict's fatalities.

Women

Historian Elizabeth D. Leonard writes that, according to various estimates, between five hundred and one thousand women enlisted as soldiers on both sides of the war, disguised as men. Women also served as spies, resistance activists, nurses, and hospital personnel. Women served on the Union hospital ship Red Rover and nursed Union and Confederate troops at field hospitals.

Mary Edwards Walker, the only woman ever to receive the Medal of Honor, served in the Union Army and was given the medal for her efforts to treat the wounded during the war. Her name was deleted from the Army Medal of Honor Roll in 1917 (along with over 900 other Medal of Honor recipients); however, it was restored in 1977.

Naval tactics

The small U.S. Navy of 1861 was rapidly enlarged to 6,000 officers and 45,000 sailors in 1865, with 671 vessels, having a tonnage of 510,396. Its mission was to blockade Confederate ports, take control of the river system, defend against Confederate raiders on the high seas, and be ready for a possible war with the British Royal Navy. Meanwhile, the main riverine war was fought in the West, where a series of major rivers gave access to the Confederate heartland. The U.S. Navy eventually gained control of the Red, Tennessee, Cumberland, Mississippi, and Ohio rivers. In the East, the Navy shelled Confederate forts and provided support for coastal army operations.

The Civil War occurred during the early stages of the industrial revolution. Many naval innovations emerged during this time, most notably the advent of the ironclad warship. It began when the Confederacy, knowing they had to meet or match the Union's naval superiority, responded to the Union blockade by building or converting more than 130 vessels, including twenty-six ironclads and floating batteries. Only half of these saw active service. Many were equipped with ram bows, creating "ram fever" among Union squadrons wherever they threatened. But in the face of overwhelming Union superiority and the Union's ironclad warships, they were unsuccessful.

In addition to ocean-going warships coming up the Mississippi, the Union Navy used timberclads, tinclads, and armored gunboats. Shipyards at Cairo, Illinois, and St. Louis built new boats or modified steamboats for action.

The Confederacy experimented with the submarine , which did not work satisfactorily, and with building an ironclad ship, which was based on rebuilding a sunken Union ship, . On its first foray, on March 8, 1862, Virginia inflicted significant damage to the Union's wooden fleet, but the next day the first Union ironclad, arrived to challenge it in the Chesapeake Bay. The resulting three-hour Battle of Hampton Roads was a draw, but it proved that ironclads were effective warships. Not long after the battle, the Confederacy was forced to scuttle the Virginia to prevent its capture, while the Union built many copies of the Monitor. Lacking the technology and infrastructure to build effective warships, the Confederacy attempted to obtain warships from Great Britain. However, this failed, because Great Britain had no interest in selling warships to a nation that was at war with a stronger enemy, and doing so could sour relations with the U.S.

Union blockade 

By early 1861, General Winfield Scott had devised the Anaconda Plan to win the war with as little bloodshed as possible, which called for blockading the Confederacy and slowly suffocating the South to surrender. Lincoln adopted parts of the plan, but chose to prosecute a more active vision of war. In April 1861, Lincoln announced the Union blockade of all Southern ports; commercial ships could not get insurance and regular traffic ended. The South blundered in embargoing cotton exports in 1861 before the blockade was effective; by the time they realized the mistake, it was too late. "King Cotton" was dead, as the South could export less than 10 percent of its cotton. The blockade shut down the ten Confederate seaports with railheads that moved almost all the cotton, especially New Orleans, Mobile, and Charleston. By June 1861, warships were stationed off the principal Southern ports, and a year later nearly 300 ships were in service.

Blockade runners 

The Confederates began the war short on military supplies and in desperate need of large quantities of arms which the agrarian South could not provide. Arms manufactures in the industrial North were restricted by an arms embargo, keeping shipments of arms from going to the South, and ending all existing and future contracts. The Confederacy subsequently looked to foreign sources for their enormous military needs and sought out financiers and companies like S. Isaac, Campbell & Company and the London Armoury Company in Britain, who acted as purchasing agents for the Confederacy, connecting them with Britain's many arms manufactures, and ultimately becoming the Confederacy's main source of arms.

To get the arms safely to the Confederacy, British investors built small, fast, steam-driven blockade runners that traded arms and supplies brought in from Britain through Bermuda, Cuba, and the Bahamas in return for high-priced cotton. Many of the ships were lightweight and designed for speed and could only carry a relatively small amount of cotton back to England. When the Union Navy seized a blockade runner, the ship and cargo were condemned as a prize of war and sold, with the proceeds given to the Navy sailors; the captured crewmen were mostly British, and they were released.

Economic impact
The Southern economy nearly collapsed during the war. There were multiple reasons for this: the severe deterioration of food supplies, especially in cities, the failure of Southern railroads, the loss of control of the main rivers, foraging by Northern armies, and the seizure of animals and crops by Confederate armies. Most historians agree that the blockade was a major factor in ruining the Confederate economy; however, Wise argues that the blockade runners provided just enough of a lifeline to allow Lee to continue fighting for additional months, thanks to fresh supplies of 400,000 rifles, lead, blankets, and boots that the homefront economy could no longer supply.

Surdam argues that the blockade was a powerful weapon that eventually ruined the Southern economy, at the cost of few lives in combat. Practically, the entire Confederate cotton crop was useless (although it was sold to Union traders), costing the Confederacy its main source of income. Critical imports were scarce and the coastal trade was largely ended as well. The measure of the blockade's success was not the few ships that slipped through, but the thousands that never tried it. Merchant ships owned in Europe could not get insurance and were too slow to evade the blockade, so they stopped calling at Confederate ports.

To fight an offensive war, the Confederacy purchased ships in Britain, converted them to warships, and raided American merchant ships in the Atlantic and Pacific oceans. Insurance rates skyrocketed and the American flag virtually disappeared from international waters. However, the same ships were reflagged with European flags and continued unmolested. After the war ended, the U.S. government demanded that Britain compensate them for the damage done by the raiders outfitted in British ports. Britain acquiesced to their demand, paying the U.S. $15 million in 1871.

Dinçaslan argues that another outcome of the blockade was oil's rise to prominence as a widely used and traded commodity. The already declining whale oil industry took a blow as many old whaling ships were used in blockade efforts such as the Stone Fleet, and Confederate raiders harassing Union whalers aggravated the situation. Oil products that had been treated mostly as lubricants, especially kerosene, started to replace whale oil used in lamps and essentially became a fuel commodity. This increased the importance of oil as a commodity, long before its eventual use as fuel for combustion engines.

Diplomacy

Although the Confederacy hoped that Britain and France would join them against the Union, this was never likely, and so they instead tried to bring the British and French governments in as mediators. The Union, under Lincoln and Secretary of State William H. Seward, worked to block this and threatened war if any country officially recognized the existence of the Confederate States of America. In 1861, Southerners voluntarily embargoed cotton shipments, hoping to start an economic depression in Europe that would force Britain to enter the war to get cotton, but this did not work. Worse, Europe turned to Egypt and India for cotton, which they found superior, hindering the South's recovery after the war.

Cotton diplomacy proved a failure as Europe had a surplus of cotton, while the 1860–62 crop failures in Europe made the North's grain exports of critical importance. It also helped to turn European opinion further away from the Confederacy. It was said that "King Corn was more powerful than King Cotton", as U.S. grain went from a quarter of the British import trade to almost half. Meanwhile, the war created employment for arms makers, ironworkers, and ships to transport weapons.

Lincoln's administration initially failed to appeal to European public opinion. At first, diplomats explained that the United States was not committed to the ending of slavery, and instead repeated legalistic arguments about the unconstitutionality of secession. Confederate representatives, on the other hand, started off much more successful, by ignoring slavery and instead focusing on their struggle for liberty, their commitment to free trade, and the essential role of cotton in the European economy. The European aristocracy was "absolutely gleeful in pronouncing the American debacle as proof that the entire experiment in popular government had failed. European government leaders welcomed the fragmentation of the ascendant American Republic." However, there was still a European public with liberal sensibilities, that the U.S. sought to appeal to by building connections with the international press. As early as 1861, many Union diplomats such as Carl Schurz realized emphasizing the war against slavery was the Union's most effective moral asset in the struggle for public opinion in Europe. Seward was concerned that an overly radical case for reunification would distress the European merchants with cotton interests; even so, Seward supported a widespread campaign of public diplomacy.

U.S. minister to Britain Charles Francis Adams proved particularly adept and convinced Britain not to openly challenge the Union blockade. The Confederacy purchased several warships from commercial shipbuilders in Britain (and some others). However, public opinion against slavery in Britain created a political liability for British politicians, where the anti-slavery movement was powerful.

War loomed in late 1861 between the U.S. and Britain over the Trent affair, which began when U.S. Navy personnel boarded the British ship  and seized two Confederate diplomats. However, London and Washington were able to smooth over the problem after Lincoln released the two men. Prince Albert had left his deathbed to issue diplomatic instructions to Lord Lyons during the Trent affair. His request was honored, and, as a result, the British response to the United States was toned down and helped avert the British becoming involved in the war. In 1862, the British government considered mediating between the Union and Confederacy, though even such an offer would have risked war with the United States. British Prime Minister Lord Palmerston reportedly read Uncle Tom's Cabin three times when deciding on what his decision would be.

The Union victory in the Battle of Antietam caused the British to delay this decision. The Emancipation Proclamation over time would reinforce the political liability of supporting the Confederacy. Realizing that Washington could not intervene in Mexico as long as the Confederacy controlled Texas, France invaded Mexico in 1861. Washington repeatedly protested France's violation of the Monroe Doctrine. Despite sympathy for the Confederacy, France's seizure of Mexico ultimately deterred it from war with the Union. Confederate offers late in the war to end slavery in return for diplomatic recognition were not seriously considered by London or Paris. After 1863, the Polish revolt against Russia further distracted the European powers and ensured that they would remain neutral.

Russia supported the Union, largely because it believed that the U.S. served as a counterbalance to its geopolitical rival, the United Kingdom. In 1863, the Russian Navy's Baltic and Pacific fleets wintered in the American ports of New York and San Francisco, respectively.

Eastern theater

The Eastern theater refers to the military operations east of the Appalachian Mountains, including the states of Virginia, West Virginia, Maryland, and Pennsylvania, the District of Columbia, and the coastal fortifications and seaports of North Carolina.

Background 
 Army of the Potomac
Maj. Gen. George B. McClellan took command of the Union Army of the Potomac on July 26, 1861 (he was briefly general-in-chief of all the Union armies, but was subsequently relieved of that post in favor of Maj. Gen. Henry W. Halleck), and the war began in earnest in 1862. The 1862 Union strategy called for simultaneous advances along four axes:

 McClellan would lead the main thrust in Virginia towards Richmond.
 Ohio forces would advance through Kentucky into Tennessee.
 The Missouri Department would drive south along the Mississippi River.
 The westernmost attack would originate from Kansas.

 Army of Northern Virginia

The primary Confederate force in the Eastern theater was the Army of Northern Virginia. The Army originated as the (Confederate) Army of the Potomac, which was organized on June 20, 1861, from all operational forces in Northern Virginia. On July 20 and 21, the Army of the Shenandoah and forces from the District of Harpers Ferry were added. Units from the Army of the Northwest were merged into the Army of the Potomac between March 14 and May 17, 1862. The Army of the Potomac was renamed Army of Northern Virginia on March 14. The Army of the Peninsula was merged into it on April 12, 1862.

When Virginia declared its secession in April 1861, Robert E. Lee chose to follow his home state, despite his desire for the country to remain intact and an offer of a senior Union command.

Lee's biographer, Douglas S. Freeman, asserts that the army received its final name from Lee when he issued orders assuming command on June 1, 1862. However, Freeman does admit that Lee corresponded with Brigadier General Joseph E. Johnston, his predecessor in army command, before that date and referred to Johnston's command as the Army of Northern Virginia. Part of the confusion results from the fact that Johnston commanded the Department of Northern Virginia (as of October 22, 1861) and the name Army of Northern Virginia can be seen as an informal consequence of its parent department's name. Jefferson Davis and Johnston did not adopt the name, but it is clear that the organization of units as of March 14 was the same organization that Lee received on June 1, and thus it is generally referred to today as the Army of Northern Virginia, even if that is correct only in retrospect.

On July 4 at Harper's Ferry, Colonel Thomas J. Jackson assigned Jeb Stuart to command all the cavalry companies of the Army of the Shenandoah. He eventually commanded the Army of Northern Virginia's cavalry.

Battles 

In one of the first highly visible battles, in July 1861, a march by Union troops under the command of Maj. Gen. Irvin McDowell on the Confederate forces led by Gen. P. G. T. Beauregard near Washington was repulsed at the First Battle of Bull Run (also known as First Manassas).

The Union had the upper hand at first, nearly pushing confederate forces holding a defensive position into a rout, but Confederate reinforcements under Joseph E. Johnston arrived from the Shenandoah Valley by railroad, and the course of the battle quickly changed. A brigade of Virginians under the relatively unknown brigadier general from the Virginia Military Institute, Thomas J. Jackson, stood its ground, which resulted in Jackson receiving his famous nickname, "Stonewall".

Upon the strong urging of President Lincoln to begin offensive operations, McClellan attacked Virginia in the spring of 1862 by way of the peninsula between the York River and James River, southeast of Richmond. McClellan's army reached the gates of Richmond in the Peninsula Campaign.

Also in the spring of 1862, in the Shenandoah Valley, Stonewall Jackson led his Valley Campaign. Employing audacity and rapid, unpredictable movements on interior lines, Jackson's 17,000 troops marched 646 miles (1,040 km) in 48 days and won several minor battles as they successfully engaged three Union armies (52,000 men), including those of Nathaniel P. Banks and John C. Fremont, preventing them from reinforcing the Union offensive against Richmond. The swiftness of Jackson's men earned them the nickname of "foot cavalry".

Johnston halted McClellan's advance at the Battle of Seven Pines, but he was wounded in the battle, and Robert E. Lee assumed his position of command. General Lee and top subordinates James Longstreet and Stonewall Jackson defeated McClellan in the Seven Days Battles and forced his retreat.

The Northern Virginia Campaign, which included the Second Battle of Bull Run, ended in yet another victory for the South. McClellan resisted General-in-Chief Halleck's orders to send reinforcements to John Pope's Union Army of Virginia, which made it easier for Lee's Confederates to defeat twice the number of combined enemy troops.

Emboldened by Second Bull Run, the Confederacy made its first invasion of the North with the Maryland Campaign. General Lee led 45,000 troops of the Army of Northern Virginia across the Potomac River into Maryland on September 5. Lincoln then restored Pope's troops to McClellan. McClellan and Lee fought at the Battle of Antietam near Sharpsburg, Maryland, on September 17, 1862, the bloodiest single day in United States military history. Lee's army, checked at last, returned to Virginia before McClellan could destroy it. Antietam is considered a Union victory because it halted Lee's invasion of the North and provided an opportunity for Lincoln to announce his Emancipation Proclamation.

When the cautious McClellan failed to follow up on Antietam, he was replaced by Maj. Gen. Ambrose Burnside. Burnside was soon defeated at the Battle of Fredericksburg on December 13, 1862, when more than 12,000 Union soldiers were killed or wounded during repeated futile frontal assaults against Marye's Heights. After the battle, Burnside was replaced by Maj. Gen. Joseph Hooker.

Hooker, too, proved unable to defeat Lee's army; despite outnumbering the Confederates by more than two to one, his Chancellorsville Campaign proved ineffective and he was humiliated in the Battle of Chancellorsville in May 1863. Chancellorsville is known as Lee's "perfect battle" because his risky decision to divide his army in the presence of a much larger enemy force resulted in a significant Confederate victory. Gen. Stonewall Jackson was shot in the arm by accidental friendly fire during the battle and subsequently died of complications. Lee famously said: "He has lost his left arm, but I have lost my right arm."

The fiercest fighting of the battle—and the second bloodiest day of the Civil War—occurred on May 3 as Lee launched multiple attacks against the Union position at Chancellorsville. That same day, John Sedgwick advanced across the Rappahannock River, defeated the small Confederate force at Marye's Heights in the Second Battle of Fredericksburg, and then moved to the west. The Confederates fought a successful delaying action at the Battle of Salem Church.

Gen. Hooker was replaced by Maj. Gen. George Meade during Lee's second invasion of the North, in June. Meade defeated Lee at the Battle of Gettysburg (July 1 to 3, 1863). This was the bloodiest battle of the war and has been called the war's turning point. Pickett's Charge on July 3 is often considered the high-water mark of the Confederacy because it signaled the collapse of serious Confederate threats of victory. Lee's army suffered 28,000 casualties (versus Meade's 23,000).

Western theater

The Western theater refers to military operations between the Appalachian Mountains and the Mississippi River, including the states of Alabama, Georgia, Florida, Mississippi, North Carolina, Kentucky, South Carolina, and Tennessee, as well as parts of Louisiana.

Background 
 Army of the Tennessee and Army of the Cumberland

The primary Union forces in the Western theater were the Army of the Tennessee and the Army of the Cumberland, named for the two rivers, the Tennessee River and Cumberland River. After Meade's inconclusive fall campaign, Lincoln turned to the Western Theater for new leadership. At the same time, the Confederate stronghold of Vicksburg surrendered, giving the Union control of the Mississippi River, permanently isolating the western Confederacy, and producing the new leader Lincoln needed, Ulysses S. Grant.

 Army of Tennessee
The primary Confederate force in the Western theater was the Army of Tennessee. The army was formed on November 20, 1862, when General Braxton Bragg renamed the former Army of Mississippi. While the Confederate forces had numerous successes in the Eastern Theater, they were defeated many times in the West.

Battles 
The Union's key strategist and tactician in the West was Ulysses S. Grant, who won victories at Forts Henry (February 6, 1862) and Donelson (February 11 to 16, 1862), earning him the nickname of "Unconditional Surrender" Grant, by which the Union seized control of the Tennessee and Cumberland Rivers. Nathan Bedford Forrest rallied nearly 4,000 Confederate troops and led them to escape across the Cumberland. Nashville and central Tennessee thus fell to the Union, leading to attrition of local food supplies and livestock and a breakdown in social organization.

Leonidas Polk's invasion of Columbus ended Kentucky's policy of neutrality and turned it against the Confederacy. Grant used river transport and Andrew Foote's gunboats of the Western Flotilla to threaten the Confederacy's "Gibraltar of the West" at Columbus, Kentucky. Although rebuffed at Belmont, Grant cut off Columbus. The Confederates, lacking their gunboats, were forced to retreat and the Union took control of western Kentucky and opened Tennessee in March 1862.

At the Battle of Shiloh, in Shiloh, Tennessee in April 1862, the Confederates made a surprise attack that pushed Union forces against the river as night fell. Overnight, the Navy landed additional reinforcements, and Grant counter-attacked. Grant and the Union won a decisive victory—the first battle with the high casualty rates that would repeat over and over. The Confederates lost Albert Sidney Johnston, considered their finest general before the emergence of Lee.

One of the early Union objectives in the war was the capture of the Mississippi River, to cut the Confederacy in half. The Mississippi River was opened to Union traffic to the southern border of Tennessee with the taking of Island No. 10 and New Madrid, Missouri, and then Memphis, Tennessee.

In April 1862, the Union Navy captured New Orleans. "The key to the river was New Orleans, the South's largest port [and] greatest industrial center." U.S. Naval forces under Farragut ran past Confederate defenses south of New Orleans. Confederate forces abandoned the city, giving the Union a critical anchor in the deep South. which allowed Union forces to begin moving up the Mississippi. Memphis fell to Union forces on June 6, 1862, and became a key base for further advances south along the Mississippi River. Only the fortress city of Vicksburg, Mississippi, prevented Union control of the entire river.

Bragg's second invasion of Kentucky in the Confederate Heartland Offensive included initial successes such as Kirby Smith's triumph at the Battle of Richmond and the capture of the Kentucky capital of Frankfort on September 3, 1862. However, the campaign ended with a meaningless victory over Maj. Gen. Don Carlos Buell at the Battle of Perryville. Bragg was forced to end his attempt at invading Kentucky and retreat due to lack of logistical support and lack of infantry recruits for the Confederacy in that state.

Bragg was narrowly defeated by Maj. Gen. William Rosecrans at the Battle of Stones River in Tennessee, the culmination of the Stones River Campaign.

Naval forces assisted Grant in the long, complex Vicksburg Campaign that resulted in the Confederates surrendering at the Battle of Vicksburg in July 1863, which cemented Union control of the Mississippi River and is considered one of the turning points of the war.

The one clear Confederate victory in the West was the Battle of Chickamauga. After Rosecrans' successful Tullahoma Campaign, Bragg, reinforced by Lt. Gen. James Longstreet's corps (from Lee's army in the east), defeated Rosecrans, despite the heroic defensive stand of Maj. Gen. George Henry Thomas.

Rosecrans retreated to Chattanooga, which Bragg then besieged in the Chattanooga Campaign. Grant marched to the relief of Rosecrans and defeated Bragg at the Third Battle of Chattanooga, eventually causing Longstreet to abandon his Knoxville Campaign and driving Confederate forces out of Tennessee and opening a route to Atlanta and the heart of the Confederacy.

Trans-Mississippi theater

Background 
The Trans-Mississippi theater refers to military operations west of the Mississippi River, encompassing most of Missouri, Arkansas, most of Louisiana, and Indian Territory (now Oklahoma). The Trans-Mississippi District was formed by the Confederate Army to better coordinate Ben McCulloch's command of troops in Arkansas and Louisiana, Sterling Price's Missouri State Guard, as well as the portion of Earl Van Dorn's command that included the Indian Territory and excluded the Army of the West. The Union's command was the Trans-Mississippi Division, or the Military Division of West Mississippi.

Battles 

The first battle of the Trans-Mississippi theater was the Battle of Wilson's Creek (August 1861). The Confederates were driven from Missouri early in the war as a result of the Battle of Pea Ridge.

Extensive guerrilla warfare characterized the trans-Mississippi region, as the Confederacy lacked the troops and the logistics to support regular armies that could challenge Union control. Roving Confederate bands such as Quantrill's Raiders terrorized the countryside, striking both military installations and civilian settlements. The "Sons of Liberty" and "Order of the American Knights" attacked pro-Union people, elected officeholders, and unarmed uniformed soldiers. These partisans could not be entirely driven out of the state of Missouri until an entire regular Union infantry division was engaged. By 1864, these violent activities harmed the nationwide anti-war movement organizing against the re-election of Lincoln. Missouri not only stayed in the Union but Lincoln took 70 percent of the vote for re-election.

Numerous small-scale military actions south and west of Missouri sought to control Indian Territory and New Mexico Territory for the Union. The Battle of Glorieta Pass was the decisive battle of the New Mexico Campaign. The Union repulsed Confederate incursions into New Mexico in 1862, and the exiled Arizona government withdrew into Texas. In the Indian Territory, civil war broke out within tribes. About 12,000 Indian warriors fought for the Confederacy and smaller numbers for the Union. The most prominent Cherokee was Brigadier General Stand Watie, the last Confederate general to surrender.

After the fall of Vicksburg in July 1863, General Kirby Smith in Texas was informed by Jefferson Davis that he could expect no further help from east of the Mississippi River. Although he lacked resources to beat Union armies, he built up a formidable arsenal at Tyler, along with his own Kirby Smithdom economy, a virtual "independent fiefdom" in Texas, including railroad construction and international smuggling. The Union, in turn, did not directly engage him. Its 1864 Red River Campaign to take Shreveport, Louisiana, was a failure and Texas remained in Confederate hands throughout the war.

Lower Seaboard theater

Background 
The Lower Seaboard theater refers to military and naval operations that occurred near the coastal areas of the Southeast (Alabama, Florida, Louisiana, Mississippi, South Carolina, and Texas) as well as the southern part of the Mississippi River (Port Hudson and south). Union Naval activities were dictated by the Anaconda Plan.

Battles 
One of the earliest battles of the war was fought at Port Royal Sound (November 1861), south of Charleston. Much of the war along the South Carolina coast concentrated on capturing Charleston. In attempting to capture Charleston, the Union military tried two approaches: by land over James or Morris Islands or through the harbor. However, the Confederates were able to drive back each Union attack. One of the most famous of the land attacks was the Second Battle of Fort Wagner, in which the 54th Massachusetts Infantry took part. The Union suffered a serious defeat in this battle, losing 1,515 soldiers while the Confederates lost only 174. However, the 54th was hailed for its valor in that battle, which encouraged the general acceptance of the recruitment of African American soldiers into the Union Army, which reinforced the Union's numerical advantage.

Fort Pulaski on the Georgia coast was an early target for the Union navy. Following the capture of Port Royal, an expedition was organized with engineer troops under the command of Captain Quincy A. Gillmore, forcing a Confederate surrender. The Union army occupied the fort for the rest of the war after repairing it.

In April 1862, a Union naval task force commanded by Commander David D. Porter attacked Forts Jackson and St. Philip, which guarded the river approach to New Orleans from the south. While part of the fleet bombarded the forts, other vessels forced a break in the obstructions in the river and enabled the rest of the fleet to steam upriver to the city. A Union army force commanded by Major General Benjamin Butler landed near the forts and forced their surrender. Butler's controversial command of New Orleans earned him the nickname "Beast".

The following year, the Union Army of the Gulf commanded by Major General Nathaniel P. Banks laid siege to Port Hudson for nearly eight weeks, the longest siege in US military history. The Confederates attempted to defend with the Bayou Teche Campaign but surrendered after Vicksburg. These two surrenders gave the Union control over the entire Mississippi.

Several small skirmishes were fought in Florida, but no major battles. The biggest was the Battle of Olustee in early 1864.

Pacific Coast theater

The Pacific Coast theater refers to military operations on the Pacific Ocean and in the states and Territories west of the Continental Divide.

Conquest of Virginia

At the beginning of 1864, Lincoln made Grant commander of all Union armies. Grant made his headquarters with the Army of the Potomac and put Maj. Gen. William Tecumseh Sherman in command of most of the western armies. Grant understood the concept of total war and believed, along with Lincoln and Sherman, that only the utter defeat of Confederate forces and their economic base would end the war. This was total war not in killing civilians but rather in taking provisions and forage and destroying homes, farms, and railroads, that Grant said "would otherwise have gone to the support of secession and rebellion. This policy I believe exercised a material influence in hastening the end." Grant devised a coordinated strategy that would strike at the entire Confederacy from multiple directions. Generals George Meade and Benjamin Butler were ordered to move against Lee near Richmond, General Franz Sigel (and later Philip Sheridan) were to attack the Shenandoah Valley, General Sherman was to capture Atlanta and march to the sea (the Atlantic Ocean), Generals George Crook and William W. Averell were to operate against railroad supply lines in West Virginia, and Maj. Gen. Nathaniel P. Banks was to capture Mobile, Alabama.

Grant's Overland Campaign 

Grant's army set out on the Overland Campaign intending to draw Lee into a defense of Richmond, where they would attempt to pin down and destroy the Confederate army. The Union army first attempted to maneuver past Lee and fought several battles, notably at the Wilderness, Spotsylvania, and Cold Harbor. These battles resulted in heavy losses on both sides and forced Lee's Confederates to fall back repeatedly. At the Battle of Yellow Tavern, the Confederates lost Jeb Stuart.

An attempt to outflank Lee from the south failed under Butler, who was trapped inside the Bermuda Hundred river bend. Each battle resulted in setbacks for the Union that mirrored what they had suffered under prior generals, though, unlike those prior generals, Grant fought on rather than retreat. Grant was tenacious and kept pressing Lee's Army of Northern Virginia back to Richmond. While Lee was preparing for an attack on Richmond, Grant unexpectedly turned south to cross the James River and began the protracted Siege of Petersburg, where the two armies engaged in trench warfare for over nine months.

Sheridan's Valley Campaign 

Grant finally found a commander, General Philip Sheridan, aggressive enough to prevail in the Valley Campaigns of 1864. Sheridan was initially repelled at the Battle of New Market by former U.S. vice president and Confederate Gen. John C. Breckinridge. The Battle of New Market was the Confederacy's last major victory of the war and included a charge by teenage VMI cadets. After redoubling his efforts, Sheridan defeated Maj. Gen. Jubal A. Early in a series of battles, including a final decisive defeat at the Battle of Cedar Creek. Sheridan then proceeded to destroy the agricultural base of the Shenandoah Valley, a strategy similar to the tactics Sherman later employed in Georgia.

Sherman's March to the Sea 

Meanwhile, Sherman maneuvered from Chattanooga to Atlanta, defeating Confederate Generals Joseph E. Johnston and John Bell Hood along the way. The fall of Atlanta on September 2, 1864, guaranteed the reelection of Lincoln as president. Hood left the Atlanta area to swing around and menace Sherman's supply lines and invade Tennessee in the Franklin–Nashville Campaign. Union Maj. Gen. John Schofield defeated Hood at the Battle of Franklin, and George H. Thomas dealt Hood a massive defeat at the Battle of Nashville, effectively destroying Hood's army.

Leaving Atlanta, and his base of supplies, Sherman's army marched, with no destination set, laying waste to about 20 percent of the farms in Georgia in his "March to the Sea". He reached the Atlantic Ocean at Savannah, Georgia, in December 1864. Sherman's army was followed by thousands of freed slaves; there were no major battles along the march. Sherman turned north through South Carolina and North Carolina to approach the Confederate Virginia lines from the south, increasing the pressure on Lee's army.

The Waterloo of the Confederacy 
Lee's army, thinned by desertion and casualties, was now much smaller than Grant's. One last Confederate attempt to break the Union hold on Petersburg failed at the decisive Battle of Five Forks (sometimes called "the Waterloo of the Confederacy") on April 1. This meant that the Union now controlled the entire perimeter surrounding Richmond-Petersburg, completely cutting it off from the Confederacy. Realizing that the capital was now lost, Lee decided to evacuate his army. The Confederate capital fell to the Union XXV Corps, composed of black troops. The remaining Confederate units fled west after a defeat at Sayler's Creek.

End of the War

Initially, Lee did not intend to surrender but planned to regroup at Appomattox Station, where supplies were to be waiting and then continue the war. Grant chased Lee and got in front of him so that when Lee's army reached the village of Appomattox Court House, they were surrounded. After an initial battle, Lee decided that the fight was now hopeless, and surrendered his Army of Northern Virginia on April 9, 1865, at "Wilmer McLean's farmhouse, located less than 100 yards west of the county courthouse", now known as the McLean House. In an untraditional gesture and as a sign of Grant's respect and anticipation of peacefully restoring Confederate states to the Union, Lee was permitted to keep his sword and his horse, Traveller. His men were paroled, and a chain of Confederate surrenders began.

On April 14, 1865, President Lincoln was shot by John Wilkes Booth, a Confederate sympathizer. Lincoln died early the next morning. Lincoln's vice president, Andrew Johnson, was unharmed, because his would-be assassin, George Atzerodt, lost his nerve, so Johnson was immediately sworn in as president. Meanwhile, Confederate forces across the South surrendered as news of Lee's surrender reached them. On April 26, 1865, the same day Boston Corbett killed Booth at a tobacco barn, General Joseph E. Johnston surrendered nearly 90,000 troops of the Army of Tennessee to Major General William Tecumseh Sherman at Bennett Place near present-day Durham, North Carolina. It proved to be the largest surrender of Confederate forces. On May 4, all remaining Confederate forces in Alabama, Louisiana east of the Mississippi River, and Mississippi under Lieutenant General Richard Taylor surrendered.

The Confederate president, Jefferson Davis, was captured at Irwinsville, Georgia on May 10, 1865.

On May 13, 1865, the last land battle of the war was fought at the Battle of Palmito Ranch in Texas.

On May 26, 1865, Confederate Lt. Gen. Simon B. Buckner, acting for General Edmund Kirby Smith, signed a military convention surrendering the Confederate trans-Mississippi Department forces. This date is often cited by contemporaries and historians as the end date of the American Civil War. On June 2, 1865, with most of his troops having already gone home, technically deserted, a reluctant Kirby Smith had little choice but to sign the official surrender document. On June 23, 1865, Cherokee leader and Confederate Brig. Gen. Stand Watie became the last Confederate general to surrender his forces.

On June 19, 1865, Union Maj. Gen. Gordon Granger announced General Order No. 3, bringing the Emancipation Proclamation into effect in Texas and freeing the last slaves of the Confederacy. The anniversary of this date is now celebrated as Juneteenth.

The naval portion of the war ended more slowly. It had begun on April 11, 1865, two days after Lee's surrender, when President Lincoln proclaimed that foreign nations had no further "claim or pretense" to deny equality of maritime rights and hospitalities to U.S. warships and, in effect, that rights extended to Confederate ships to use neutral ports as safe havens from U.S. warships should end. Having no response to Lincoln's proclamation, President Andrew Johnson issued a similar proclamation dated May 10, 1865, more directly stating the premise that the war was almost at an end ("armed resistance...may be regarded as virtually at an end") and that insurgent cruisers still at sea and prepared to attack U.S. ships should not have rights to do so through use of safe foreign ports or waters and warned nations which continued to do so that their government vessels would be denied access to U.S. ports. He also "enjoined" U.S. officers to arrest the cruisers and their crews so "that they may be prevented from committing further depredations on commerce and that the persons on board of them may no longer enjoy impunity for their crimes". England finally responded on June 6, 1865, by transmitting a June 2, 1865 letter from England's Foreign Secretary John Russell, 1st Earl Russell to the Lords of the Admiralty (United Kingdom) withdrawing rights to Confederate warships to enter British ports and waters but with exceptions for a limited time to allow a captain to enter a port to "divest his vessel of her warlike character" and for U.S. ships to be detained in British ports or waters to allow Confederate cruisers twenty-four hours to leave first. U.S. Secretary of State William Seward welcomed the withdrawal of concessions to the Confederates but objected to the exceptions. Finally, on October 18, 1865, Russell advised the Admiralty that the time specified in his June 2, 1865 message had elapsed and "all measures of a restrictive nature on vessels of war of the United States in British ports, harbors, and waters, are now to be considered as at an end". Nonetheless, the final Confederate surrender was in Liverpool, England where James Iredell Waddell, the captain of the CSS Shenandoah, surrendered the cruiser to British authorities on November 6, 1865.

Legally, the war did not end until August 20, 1866, when President Andrew Johnson issued a proclamation that declared "that the said insurrection is at an end and that peace, order, tranquillity, and civil authority now exist in and throughout the whole of the United States of America".

Union victory and aftermath

Explaining the Union victory

The causes of the war, the reasons for its outcome, and even the name of the war itself are subjects of lingering contention today. The North and West grew rich while the once-rich South became poor for a century. The national political power of the slaveowners and rich Southerners ended. Historians are less sure about the results of the postwar Reconstruction, especially regarding the second-class citizenship of the freedmen and their poverty.

Historians have debated whether the Confederacy could have won the war. Most scholars, including James M. McPherson, argue that Confederate victory was at least possible. McPherson argues that the North's advantage in population and resources made Northern victory likely but not guaranteed. He also argues that if the Confederacy had fought using unconventional tactics, it would have more easily been able to hold out long enough to exhaust the Union.

Confederates did not need to invade and hold enemy territory to win but only needed to fight a defensive war to convince the North that the cost of winning was too high. The North needed to conquer and hold vast stretches of enemy territory and defeat Confederate armies to win. Lincoln was not a military dictator and could continue to fight the war only as long as the American public supported a continuation of the war. The Confederacy sought to win independence by outlasting Lincoln; however, after Atlanta fell and Lincoln defeated McClellan in the election of 1864, all hope for a political victory for the South ended. At that point, Lincoln had secured the support of the Republicans, War Democrats, the border states, emancipated slaves, and the neutrality of Britain and France. By defeating the Democrats and McClellan, he also defeated the Copperheads, who had wanted a negotiated peace with the Confederate States of America.

Some scholars argue that the Union held an insurmountable long-term advantage over the Confederacy in industrial strength and population. Confederate actions, they argue, only delayed defeat. Civil War historian Shelby Foote expressed this view succinctly: "I think that the North fought that war with one hand behind its back .... If there had been more Southern victories, and a lot more, the North simply would have brought that other hand out from behind its back. I don't think the South ever had a chance to win that War."

A minority view among historians is that the Confederacy lost because, as E. Merton Coulter put it, "people did not will hard enough and long enough to win." However, most historians reject the argument. McPherson, after reading thousands of letters written by Confederate soldiers, found strong patriotism that continued to the end; they truly believed they were fighting for freedom and liberty. Even as the Confederacy was visibly collapsing in 1864–65, he says most Confederate soldiers were fighting hard. Historian Gary Gallagher cites General Sherman, who in early 1864 commented, "The devils seem to have a determination that cannot but be admired." Despite their loss of slaves and wealth, with starvation looming, Sherman continued, "yet I see no sign of let-up—some few deserters—plenty tired of war, but the masses determined to fight it out."

Also important were Lincoln's eloquence in rationalizing the national purpose and his skill in keeping the border states committed to the Union cause. The Emancipation Proclamation was an effective use of the President's war powers. The Confederate government failed in its attempt to get Europe involved in the war militarily, particularly Great Britain and France. Southern leaders needed to get European powers to help break up the blockade the Union had created around the Southern ports and cities. Lincoln's naval blockade was 95% effective at stopping trade goods; as a result, imports and exports to the South declined significantly. The abundance of European cotton and Britain's hostility to the institution of slavery, along with Lincoln's Atlantic and Gulf of Mexico naval blockades, severely decreased any chance that either Britain or France would enter the war.

Historian Don Doyle has argued that the Union victory had a major impact on the course of world history. The Union victory energized popular democratic forces. A Confederate victory, on the other hand, would have meant a new birth of slavery, not freedom. Historian Fergus Bordewich, following Doyle, argues that:

Scholars have debated what the effects of the war were on political and economic power in the South. The prevailing view is that the southern planter elite retained its powerful position in the South. However, a 2017 study challenges this, noting that while some Southern elites retained their economic status, the turmoil of the 1860s created greater opportunities for economic mobility in the South than in the North.

Casualties 

The war resulted in at least 1,030,000 casualties (3 percent of the population), including about 620,000 soldier deaths—two-thirds by disease—and 50,000 civilians. Binghamton University historian J. David Hacker believes the number of soldier deaths was approximately 750,000, 20 percent higher than traditionally estimated, and possibly as high as 850,000. A novel way of calculating casualties by looking at the deviation of the death rate of men of fighting age from the norm through analysis of census data found that at least 627,000 and at most 888,000 people, but most likely 761,000 people, died in the war. As historian McPherson notes, the war's "cost in American lives was as great as in all of the nation's other wars combined through Vietnam."

Based on 1860 census figures, 8 percent of all white men aged 13 to 43 died in the war, including 6 percent in the North and 18 percent in the South. About 56,000 soldiers died in prison camps during the War. An estimated 60,000 soldiers lost limbs in the war.

Of the 359,528 Union army dead, amounting to 15 percent of the over two million who served:
 110,070 were killed in action (67,000) or died of wounds (43,000).
 199,790 died of disease (75 percent was due to the war, the remainder would have occurred in civilian life anyway)
 24,866 died in Confederate prison camps
 9,058 were killed by accidents or drowning
 15,741 other/unknown deaths

In addition there were 4,523 deaths in the Navy (2,112 in battle) and 460 in the Marines (148 in battle).

Black troops made up 10 percent of the Union death toll — 15 percent of Union deaths from disease and less than 3 percent of those killed in battle. Losses among African Americans were high. In the last year and a half and from all reported casualties, approximately 20 percent of all African Americans enrolled in the military died during the Civil War. Notably, their mortality rate was significantly higher than that of white soldiers. While 15.2% of United States Volunteers and just 8.6% of white Regular Army troops died, 20.5% of United States Colored Troops died.

The United States National Park Service uses the following figures in its official tally of war losses:

Union: 853,838
 110,100 killed in action
 224,580 disease deaths
 275,154 wounded in action
 211,411 captured (including 30,192 who died as POWs)

Confederate: 914,660
 94,000 killed in action
 164,000 disease deaths
 194,026 wounded in action
 462,634 captured (including 31,000 who died as POWs)

While the figures of 360,000 army deaths for the Union and 260,000 for the Confederacy remained commonly cited, they are incomplete. In addition to many Confederate records being missing, partly as a result of Confederate widows not reporting deaths due to being ineligible for benefits, both armies only counted troops who died during their service and not the tens of thousands who died of wounds or diseases after being discharged. This often happened only a few days or weeks later. Francis Amasa Walker, superintendent of the 1870 census, used census and surgeon general data to estimate a minimum of 500,000 Union military deaths and 350,000 Confederate military deaths, for a total death toll of 850,000 soldiers. While Walker's estimates were originally dismissed because of the 1870 census's undercounting, it was later found that the census was only off by 6.5% and that the data Walker used would be roughly accurate.

Analyzing the number of dead by using census data to calculate the deviation of the death rate of men of fighting age from the norm suggests that at least 627,000 and at most 888,000, but most likely 761,000 soldiers, died in the war. This would break down to approximately 350,000 Confederate and 411,000 Union military deaths, going by the proportion of Union to Confederate battle losses.

Deaths among former slaves has proven much harder to estimate, due to the lack of reliable census data at the time, though they were known to be considerable, as former slaves were set free or escaped in massive numbers in an area where the Union army did not have sufficient shelter, doctors, or food for them. University of Connecticut Professor Jim Downs states that tens to hundreds of thousands of slaves died during the war from disease, starvation, or exposure and that if these deaths are counted in the war's total, the death toll would exceed 1 million.

Losses were far higher than during the recent defeat of Mexico, which saw roughly thirteen thousand American deaths, including fewer than two thousand killed in battle, between 1846 and 1848. One reason for the high number of battle deaths during the war was the continued use of tactics similar to those of the Napoleonic Wars at the turn of the century, such as charging. With the advent of more accurate rifled barrels, Minié balls, and (near the end of the war for the Union army) repeating firearms such as the Spencer Repeating Rifle and the Henry Repeating Rifle, soldiers were mowed down when standing in lines in the open. This led to the adoption of trench warfare, a style of fighting that defined much of World War I.

Emancipation 

Abolishing slavery was not a Union war goal from the outset, but it quickly became one. Lincoln's initial claims were that preserving the Union was the central goal of the war. In contrast, the South saw itself as fighting to preserve slavery. While not all Southerners saw themselves as fighting for slavery, most of the officers and over a third of the rank and file in Lee's army had close family ties to slavery. To Northerners, in contrast, the motivation was primarily to preserve the Union, not to abolish slavery. However, as the war dragged on, and it became clear that slavery was central to the conflict, and that emancipation was (to quote from the Emancipation Proclamation) "a fit and necessary war measure for suppressing [the] rebellion," Lincoln and his cabinet made ending slavery a war goal, culminating in the Emancipation Proclamation. Lincoln's decision to issue the Emancipation Proclamation angered both Peace Democrats ("Copperheads") and War Democrats, but energized most Republicans. By warning that free blacks would flood the North, Democrats made gains in the 1862 elections, but they did not gain control of Congress. The Republicans' counterargument that slavery was the mainstay of the enemy steadily gained support, with the Democrats losing decisively in the 1863 elections in the Northern state of Ohio when they tried to resurrect anti-black sentiment.

Emancipation Proclamation 

Slavery for the Confederacy's 3.5 million blacks effectively ended in each area when Union armies arrived; they were nearly all freed by the Emancipation Proclamation. The last Confederate slaves were freed on June 19, 1865, celebrated as the modern holiday of Juneteenth. Slaves in the border states and those located in some former Confederate territory occupied before the Emancipation Proclamation were freed by state action or (on December 6, 1865) by the Thirteenth Amendment. The Emancipation Proclamation enabled African Americans, both free blacks and escaped slaves, to join the Union Army. About 190,000 volunteered, further enhancing the numerical advantage the Union armies enjoyed over the Confederates, who did not dare emulate the equivalent manpower source for fear of fundamentally undermining the legitimacy of slavery.

During the Civil War, sentiment concerning slaves, enslavement and emancipation in the United States was divided. Lincoln's fears of making slavery a war issue were based on a harsh reality: abolition did not enjoy wide support in the west, the territories, and the border states. In 1861, Lincoln worried that premature attempts at emancipation would mean the loss of the border states, and that "to lose Kentucky is nearly the same as to lose the whole game." Copperheads and some War Democrats opposed emancipation, although the latter eventually accepted it as part of the total war needed to save the Union.

At first, Lincoln reversed attempts at emancipation by Secretary of War Simon Cameron and Generals John C. Frémont (in Missouri) and David Hunter (in South Carolina, Georgia and Florida) to keep the loyalty of the border states and the War Democrats. Lincoln warned the border states that a more radical type of emancipation would happen if his plan of gradual compensated emancipation and voluntary colonization was rejected. But compensated emancipation occurred only in the District of Columbia, where Congress had the power to enact it. When Lincoln told his cabinet about his proposed emancipation proclamation, which would apply to the states still in rebellion on January 1, 1863, Seward advised Lincoln to wait for a Union military victory before issuing it, as to do otherwise would seem like "our last shriek on the retreat". Lincoln laid the groundwork for public support in an open letter published in response to Horace Greeley's "The Prayer of Twenty Millions". He also laid the groundwork at a meeting at the White House with five African American representatives on August 14, 1862. Arranging for a reporter to be present, he urged his visitors to agree to the voluntary colonization of black people, apparently to make his forthcoming preliminary Emancipation Proclamation more palatable to racist white people. A Union victory in the Battle of Antietam on September 17, 1862, provided Lincoln with an opportunity to issue the preliminary Emancipation Proclamation, and the subsequent War Governors' Conference added support for the proclamation.

Lincoln issued his preliminary Emancipation Proclamation on September 22, 1862. It stated that the slaves in all states in rebellion on January 1, 1863, would be free. He issued his final Emancipation Proclamation on January 1, 1863, keeping his promise. In his letter to Albert G. Hodges, Lincoln explained his belief that "If slavery is not wrong, nothing is wrong .... And yet I have never understood that the Presidency conferred upon me an unrestricted right to act officially upon this judgment and feeling .... I claim not to have controlled events, but confess plainly that events have controlled me."

Lincoln's moderate approach succeeded in inducing the border states to remain in the Union and War Democrats to support the Union. The border states (Kentucky, Missouri, Maryland, Delaware) and Union-controlled regions around New Orleans, Norfolk, and elsewhere, were not covered by the Emancipation Proclamation. Nor was Tennessee, which had come under Union control. Missouri and Maryland abolished slavery on their own; Kentucky and Delaware did not. Still, the proclamation did not enjoy universal support. It caused much unrest in what were then considered western states, where racist sentiments led to a great fear of abolition. There was some concern that the proclamation would lead to the secession of western states, and its issuance prompted the stationing of Union troops in Illinois in case of rebellion.

Since the Emancipation Proclamation was based on the President's war powers, it applied only in territory held by Confederates at the time it was issued. However, the Proclamation became a symbol of the Union's growing commitment to add emancipation to the Union's definition of liberty. The Emancipation Proclamation greatly reduced the Confederacy's hope of being recognized or otherwise aided by Britain or France. By late 1864, Lincoln was playing a leading role in getting the House of Representatives to vote for the Thirteenth Amendment to the United States Constitution, which mandated the ending of chattel slavery.

Reconstruction 

 The war had utterly devastated the South and posed serious questions of how the South would be re-integrated to the Union. The war destroyed much of the wealth that had existed in the South. All accumulated investment in Confederate bonds was forfeited; most banks and railroads were bankrupt. The income per person in the South dropped to less than 40 percent of that of the North, a condition that lasted until well into the 20th century. Southern influence in the federal government, previously considerable, was greatly diminished until the latter half of the 20th century. Reconstruction began during the war, with the Emancipation Proclamation of January 1, 1863, and it continued until 1877. It comprised multiple complex methods to resolve the outstanding issues of the war's aftermath, the most important of which were the three "Reconstruction Amendments" to the Constitution: the 13th outlawing slavery (1865), the 14th guaranteeing citizenship to slaves (1868), and the 15th ensuring voting rights to slaves (1870). From the Union perspective, the goals of Reconstruction were to consolidate the Union victory on the battlefield by reuniting the Union, to guarantee a "republican form of government" for the ex-Confederate states, and to permanently end slavery—and prevent semi-slavery status.

President Johnson took a lenient approach and saw the achievement of the main war goals as realized in 1865 when each ex-rebel state repudiated secession and ratified the Thirteenth Amendment. Radical Republicans demanded proof that Confederate nationalism was dead and that the slaves were truly free. They overrode Johnson's vetoes of civil rights legislation, and the House impeached him, although the Senate did not convict him. In 1868 and 1872, the Republican candidate Ulysses S. Grant won the presidency. In 1872, the "Liberal Republicans" argued that the war goals had been achieved and that Reconstruction should end. They chose Horace Greeley to head a presidential ticket in 1872 but were decisively defeated. In 1874, Democrats, primarily Southern, took control of Congress and opposed further reconstruction. The Compromise of 1877 closed with a national consensus, except perhaps on the part of former slaves, that the Civil War had finally ended. With the withdrawal of federal troops, however, whites retook control of every Southern legislature, and the Jim Crow era of disenfranchisement and legal segregation was ushered in.

The Civil War would have a huge impact on American politics in the years to come. Many veterans on both sides were subsequently elected to political office, including five U.S. Presidents: General Ulysses Grant, Rutherford B. Hayes, James Garfield, Benjamin Harrison, and William McKinley.

Memory and historiography

The Civil War is one of the central events in American collective memory. There are innumerable statues, commemorations, books, and archival collections. The memory includes the home front, military affairs, the treatment of soldiers, both living and dead, in the war's aftermath, depictions of the war in literature and art, evaluations of heroes and villains, and considerations of the moral and political lessons of the war. The last theme includes moral evaluations of racism and slavery, heroism in combat and heroism behind the lines, and issues of democracy and minority rights, as well as the notion of an "Empire of Liberty" influencing the world.

Professional historians have paid much more attention to the causes of the war than to the war itself. Military history has largely developed outside academia, leading to a proliferation of studies by non-scholars who nevertheless are familiar with the primary sources and pay close attention to battles and campaigns and who write for the general public. Bruce Catton and Shelby Foote are among the best known. Practically every major figure in the war, both North and South, has had a serious biographical study.

Lost Cause

The memory of the war in the white South crystallized in the myth of the "Lost Cause": that the Confederate cause was just and heroic. The myth shaped regional identity and race relations for generations. Alan T. Nolan notes that the Lost Cause was expressly a rationalization, a cover-up to vindicate the name and fame of those in rebellion. Some claims revolve around the insignificance of slavery as a cause of the war; some appeals highlight cultural differences between North and South; the military conflict by Confederate actors is idealized; in any case, secession was said to be lawful. Nolan argues that the adoption of the Lost Cause perspective facilitated the reunification of the North and the South while excusing the "virulent racism" of the 19th century, sacrificing black American progress to white man's reunification. He also deems the Lost Cause "a caricature of the truth. This caricature wholly misrepresents and distorts the facts of the matter" in every instance. The Lost Cause myth was formalized by Charles A. Beard and Mary R. Beard, whose The Rise of American Civilization (1927) spawned "Beardian historiography". The Beards downplayed slavery, abolitionism, and issues of morality. Though this interpretation was abandoned by the Beards in the 1940s, and by historians generally by the 1950s, Beardian themes still echo among Lost Cause writers.

Battlefield preservation

The first efforts at Civil War battlefield preservation and memorialization came during the war itself with the establishment of National Cemeteries at Gettysburg, Mill Springs and Chattanooga. Soldiers began erecting markers on battlefields beginning with the First Battle of Bull Run in July 1861, but the oldest surviving monument is the Hazen Brigade Monument near Murfreesboro, Tennessee, built in the summer of 1863 by soldiers in Union Col. William B. Hazen's brigade to mark the spot where they buried their dead following the Battle of Stones River. In the 1890s, the United States government established five Civil War battlefield parks under the jurisdiction of the War Department, beginning with the creation of the Chickamauga and Chattanooga National Military Park in Tennessee and the Antietam National Battlefield in Maryland in 1890. The Shiloh National Military Park was established in 1894, followed by the Gettysburg National Military Park in 1895 and Vicksburg National Military Park in 1899. In 1933, these five parks and other national monuments were transferred to the jurisdiction of the National Park Service. Chief among modern efforts to preserve Civil War sites has been the American Battlefield Trust, with more than 130 battlefields in 24 states. The five major Civil War battlefield parks operated by the National Park Service (Gettysburg, Antietam, Shiloh, Chickamauga/Chattanooga and Vicksburg) had a combined 3.1 million visitors in 2018, down 70% from 10.2 million in 1970.

Civil War commemoration

The American Civil War has been commemorated in many capacities, ranging from the reenactment of battles to statues and memorial halls erected, to films being produced, to stamps and coins with Civil War themes being issued, all of which helped to shape public memory. These commemorations occurred in greater numbers on the 100th and 150th anniversaries of the war.
Hollywood's take on the war has been especially influential in shaping public memory, as in such film classics as The Birth of a Nation (1915), Gone with the Wind (1939), and Lincoln (2012). Ken Burns's PBS television series The Civil War (1990) is especially well-remembered, though criticized for its historical inaccuracy.

Technological significance
Numerous technological innovations during the Civil War had a great impact on 19th-century science. The Civil War was one of the earliest examples of an "industrial war", in which technological might is used to achieve military supremacy in a war. New inventions, such as the train and telegraph, delivered soldiers, supplies and messages at a time when horses were considered to be the fastest way to travel. It was also in this war that aerial warfare, in the form of reconnaissance balloons, was first used. It saw the first action involving steam-powered ironclad warships in naval warfare history. Repeating firearms such as the Henry rifle, Spencer rifle, Colt revolving rifle, Triplett & Scott carbine and others, first appeared during the Civil War; they were a revolutionary invention that would soon replace muzzle-loading and single-shot firearms in warfare. The war also saw the first appearances of rapid-firing weapons and machine guns such as the Agar gun and the Gatling gun.

In works of culture and art
The Civil War is one of the most studied events in American history, and the collection of cultural works around it is enormous. This section gives an abbreviated overview of the most notable works.

Literature
 "When Lilacs Last in the Dooryard Bloom'd" and "O Captain! My Captain!" (1865) by Walt Whitman, famous eulogies to Lincoln
 Battle-Pieces and Aspects of the War (1866) poetry by Herman Melville
 The Rise and Fall of the Confederate Government (1881) by Jefferson Davis
 The Private History of a Campaign That Failed (1885) by Mark Twain
 Texar's Revenge, or, North Against South (1887) by Jules Verne
 "An Occurrence at Owl Creek Bridge" (1890) by Ambrose Bierce
 The Red Badge of Courage (1895) by Stephen Crane
 Gone with the Wind (1936) by Margaret Mitchell
 North and South (1982) by John Jakes
 The March: A Novel (2005) by E. L. Doctorow, fictionalized account of Sherman's March to the Sea

Film

 The Birth of a Nation (1915, US)
 The General (1926, US)
 Operator 13 (1934, US)
 Gone with the Wind (1939, US)
 The Red Badge of Courage (1951, US)
 The Horse Soldiers (1959, US)
 Shenandoah (1965, US)
 The Good, the Bad and the Ugly (1966, Italy-Spain-FRG)
 The Beguiled (1971, US)
 The Outlaw Josey Wales (1976, US)
 Glory (1989, US)
 The Civil War (1990, US)
 Gettysburg (1993, US)
 The Last Outlaw (1993, US)
 Cold Mountain (2003, US)
 Gods and Generals (2003, US)
 North and South (miniseries)
 Lincoln (2012, US)
 Free State of Jones (2016, US)

Music

 "Dixie"
 "Battle Cry of Freedom"
 "Battle Hymn of the Republic"
 "The Bonnie Blue Flag"
 "John Brown's Body"
 "When Johnny Comes Marching Home"
 "Marching Through Georgia"
 "The Night They Drove Old Dixie Down"

Video games

 North & South (1989, FR)
 Sid Meier's Gettysburg! (1997, US)
 Sid Meier's Antietam! (1999, US)
 American Conqest: Divided Nation (2006, US)
 Forge of Freedom: The American Civil War (2006, US)
 The History Channel: Civil War – A Nation Divided (2006, US)
 Ageod's American Civil War (2007, US/FR)
 History Civil War: Secret Missions (2008, US)
 Call of Juarez: Bound in Blood (2009, US)
 Darkest of Days (2009, US)
 Victoria II: A House Divided (2011, US)
 Ageod's American Civil War II (2013, US/FR)
 Ultimate General: Gettysburg (2014, UKR)
 Ultimate General: Civil War (2016, UKR)
 War of Rights (2018, US)

See also

General reference
 American Civil War Corps Badges
 List of American Civil War battles
 List of costliest American Civil War land battles
 List of weapons in the American Civil War
 Second American Civil War

Union
 Presidency of Abraham Lincoln
 Uniform of the Union Army

Confederacy
 Central Confederacy
 Uniforms of the Confederate States Armed Forces

Ethnic articles
 African Americans in the American Civil War
 German Americans in the American Civil War
 Irish Americans in the American Civil War
 Italian Americans in the American Civil War
 Native Americans in the American Civil War

Topical articles
 Commemoration of the American Civil War
 Commemoration of the American Civil War on postage stamps
 Dorothea Dix
 Education of freed people during the Civil War
 
 Spies in the American Civil War
 Gender issues in the American Civil War
 Infantry in the American Civil War
 List of ships captured in the 19th century#American Civil War
 Slavery during the American Civil War

National articles
 Canada in the American Civil War
 Foreign enlistment in the American Civil War
 Prussia in the American Civil War
 United Kingdom in the American Civil War

State articles
 :Category:American Civil War by state

Memorials
 List of Confederate monuments and memorials
 List of memorials and monuments at Arlington National Cemetery
 List of memorials to Jefferson Davis
 List of memorials to Robert E. Lee
 List of memorials to Stonewall Jackson
 List of monuments erected by the United Daughters of the Confederacy
 List of monuments of the Gettysburg Battlefield
 List of Union Civil War monuments and memorials
 Memorials to Abraham Lincoln
 Removal of Confederate monuments and memorials

Other modern civil wars in the world

 Boxer Rebellion
 Chinese Civil War
 Finnish Civil War
 Mexican Revolution
 Russian Civil War
 Spanish Civil War
 Taiping Rebellion

References

Notes

Citations

Bibliography

 
 
 
 Beringer, Richard E., Archer Jones, and Herman Hattaway (1986). Why the South Lost the Civil War, influential analysis of factors; an abridged version is The Elements of Confederate Defeat: Nationalism, War Aims, and Religion (1988)
 
 
 
 
 
 
 
 
 
 
 
 
 Gallagher, Gary W. (2011). The Union War. Cambridge, Massachusetts: Harvard University Press. .
 Gara, Larry (1964). "The Fugitive Slave Law: A Double Paradox," in Unger, Irwin, Essays on the Civil War and Reconstruction, New York: Holt, Rinehart and Winston, 1970 (originally published in Civil War History, Vol. 10, No. 3, September 1964, pp. 229–240).
 
 
 
 
 
 
 
 
 
 
 
 
 
 
 
 
 
 
 
 
 
 Nevins, Allan. Ordeal of the Union, an 8-volume set (1947–1971). the most detailed political, economic and military narrative; by Pulitzer Prize-winner
 1. Fruits of Manifest Destiny, 1847–1852 online; 2. A House Dividing, 1852–1857; 3. Douglas, Buchanan, and Party Chaos, 1857–1859; 4. Prologue to Civil War, 1859–1861; vols 5–8 have the series title War for the Union; 5. The Improvised War, 1861–1862; 6. online; War Becomes Revolution, 1862–1863; 7. The Organized War, 1863–1864; 8. The Organized War to Victory, 1864–1865
 
 
 
 
 
 Sheehan-Dean, Aaron. A Companion to the U.S. Civil War 2 vol. (April 2014) Wiley-Blackwell, New York . 1232pp; 64 Topical chapters by scholars and experts; emphasis on historiography.
 
 
 
 
 
 
 
 
 
 
 
 
   Borrow book at: archive.org

Further reading

External links

 West Point Atlas of Civil War Battles
 Civil War photos at the National Archives
 View images from the Civil War Photographs Collection at the Library of Congress
 American Battlefield Trust – A non-profit land preservation and educational organization with two divisions, the Civil War Trust and the Revolutionary War Trust, dedicated to preserving America's battlefields through land acquisitions.
 Civil War Era Digital Collection at Gettysburg College – This collection contains digital images of political cartoons, personal papers, pamphlets, maps, paintings and photographs from the Civil War Era held in Special Collections at Gettysburg College.
 Civil War 150  – Washington Post interactive website on the 150th Anniversary of the American Civil War.
 Civil War in the American South  – An Association of Southeastern Research Libraries (ASERL) portal with links to almost 9,000 digitized Civil War-era items—books, pamphlets, broadsides, letters, maps, personal papers, and manuscripts—held at ASERL member libraries
 The Civil War – site with 7,000 pages, including the complete run of Harper's Weekly newspapers from the Civil War
 
 "American Civil World" maps at the Persuasive Cartography, The PJ Mode Collection, Cornell University Library
 Civil War Manuscripts at Shapell Manuscript Foundation
 Statements of each state as to why they were seceding, battlefields.org

 
Rebellions against the United States
Conflicts in 1861
Conflicts in 1862
Conflicts in 1863
Conflicts in 1864
Conflicts in 1865
19th-century conflicts
Civil War
1860s in the United States
Wars of independence
Internal wars of the United States
1860s conflicts